Oxycanus stellans is a moth of the family Hepialidae. It is found in Victoria.

The larvae possibly feed on Acacia species.

References

Moths described in 1935
Hepialidae
Endemic fauna of Australia